The 2004 TCU Horned Frogs football team represented Texas Christian University in the 2004 NCAA Division I-A football season. TCU finished with a 5–6 (3–5 C-USA) record.

The team was coached by Gary Patterson and played their home games at Amon G. Carter Stadium, which is located on campus in Fort Worth. This was TCU's final year Conference USA before moving to the Mountain West Conference (MWC).

Schedule

References

TCU
TCU Horned Frogs football seasons
TCU Horned Frogs football